The Perdigueiro Galego is a rare breed of pointer from the autonomous community of Galicia in north-western Spain. It is one of four traditional breeds of the region, the others being the Can de Palleiro, the Guicho or Quisquelo, and the Podengo Galego.

History
The Perdigueiro Galego, along with a number of regional pointers such as the Old Spanish Pointer, the Portuguese Pointer, the Pachón Navarro, the Braque Français, descends from dogs of Bracco Italiano type imported into north-western Iberia and south-western France several centuries ago, all developing into distinct types according to the preferences and requirements of local sportsmen.

The Perdigueiro Galego was most commonly found in the municipalities of A Mezquita, Viana do Bolo, Riós, Laza and A Veiga in the Galician Province of Ourense. From the 1970s onward, foreign breeds of pointer became available to Spanish hunters and numbers of the Perdigueiro Galego went into decline; this was compounded by a decline in partridge numbers throughout the Galician Massif. To prevent the extinction of the breed, the best specimens still available were located and recorded, particularly from the provinces of Ourense and Lugo.

Description
The breed has a short dense coat, which may be spotted or mottled bicoloured or tricoloured with any of chestnut, orange, cinnamon and black on white; solid brown, yellow or black examples are also found.

Use
The breed is a versatile pointing breed in that it is used to hunt, point and retrieve game once shot by the hunter. The Perdigueiro Galego is used predominantly to hunt game birds, in particular partridge, quail and woodcock, although it is also used to hunt small ground game such as hare and rabbit.

See also
 Dogs portal
 List of dog breeds

References

Gundogs
Pointers
Dog breeds originating in Galicia (Spain)